Prezbo or PrezBo may refer to:

 Lee Bollinger, the current president of Columbia University.
 Roland "Prez" Pryzbylewski, a fictional character from the HBO drama The Wire.